Independence and Mango Creek are adjacent villages in the Stann Creek District of Belize. For the purposes of the census, they are counted as one community. In 2010, Independence and Mango Creek had a combined population of 4,014 people. It is a relatively large village compared to its surrounding communities. It contains 2 primary schools,  one secondary school and one college which hosts students from the surrounding communities, and provides access to the only mainland bay.

Populated places in Stann Creek District